Ana Milović (born 31 July 2001) is a Slovenian footballer who plays as a forward for Olimpija Ljubljana and the Slovenia women's national team.

Club career
In the curtailed 2019–20 Slovenian Women's League season, Milović scored 29 goals in 12 appearances for Olimpija to finish as the top scorer.

International career
Milović has been capped for the Slovenia national team, appearing for the team during the 2019 FIFA Women's World Cup qualifying cycle. She won her first senior cap in a 4–0 defeat by the Czech Republic on 20 October 2017. She scored her first national team goal in a 3–0 UEFA Women's Euro 2022 qualifying win over Kosovo on 10 March 2020.

References

External links
 Player profile at NZS 
 
 
 

2001 births
Living people
Slovenian women's footballers
Slovenia women's international footballers
Women's association football midfielders
ŽNK Radomlje players
ŽNK Olimpija Ljubljana players